Cattleya cinnabarina is a lithophyte from Brazil, growing at intermediate elevations. The inflorescences emerge from the top of new pseudobulbs, each carrying a dozen or so bright orange flowers.

Images

References

External links 

cinnabarina
Endemic orchids of Brazil